Mykhaylo Ivanovych Chemberzhi (15 July 1944 – 5 March 2018) was a Ukrainian composer, teacher, scientist and politician. Director of Kyiv Children's Academy of Arts.

Scientific publication 

Author of about 60 scientific publications. Composer of works in a variety of genres, including orchestral works, opera and ballet.

References

External links
 Біографія на сайті Національної спілки композиторів України
 Біографія на сайті Національної академії мистецтв України
 Відійшов у вічність /Сайт Національної академії педагогчних наук, 5.3.2018/
 Раптово помер Михайло Чембержі /День, 5.3.2018/
 Чембержі М.І. /Сайт "Відкрита Україна"/

1944 births
2018 deaths
Ukrainian classical composers
People from Izmail
Full Members of the Ukrainian Academy of Arts